Martina Navratilova was the defending singles champion of the Virginia Slims of Washington tennis tournament and won in the final 6–1, 6–1 against Sylvia Hanika.

The draw consisted of 32 players of which eight were seeded. The main draw was preceded by a 32-player qualifying competition.

Seeds
A champion seed is indicated in bold text while text in italics indicates the round in which that seed was eliminated.

  Martina Navratilova (champion)
  Andrea Jaeger (semifinals)
  Hana Mandlíková (quarterfinals)
  Barbara Potter (quarterfinals)
  Bettina Bunge (first round)
  Sylvia Hanika (final)
  Anne Smith (second round)
  Zina Garrison (second round)

Draw

References

External links
 1983 Virginia Slims of Washington draw

Virginia Slims of Washington
1983 Virginia Slims World Championship Series